Brickey's or Brickeys is an unincorporated community located in Jackson Township in Sainte Genevieve County, Missouri, United States. The town lies 11 miles to the northwest of Ste. Genevieve on the Mississippi River.

History
Brickey's was named after John Brickey, who operated a grist mill and a riverboat landing on the Mississippi River at the location. The full name was originally Brickey's Landing.

A post office called Brickeys was established in 1906, and remained in operation until 1953.

References

Unincorporated communities in Ste. Genevieve County, Missouri
Unincorporated communities in Missouri